The Roman Catholic Diocese of Garzón is a diocese located in the city of Garzón in the Ecclesiastical province of Ibagué in Colombia.

History
 20 May 1900: Established as Diocese of Garzón from the Diocese of Tolima
 25 February 1964: Renamed as Diocese of Garzón-Neiva
 24 July 1972: Renamed as Diocese of Garzón

Bishops

Ordinaries, in reverse chronological order
 Bishops of Garzón, below
 Fabio Duque Jaramillo, O.F.M. (2012.06.11 – 2022.02.09)
 Rigoberto Corredor Bermúdez (2003.12.19 – 2011.07.15)
 Libardo Ramírez Gómez (1986.10.18 – 2003.03.15)
 Ramón Mantilla Duarte, C.Ss.R. (1977.04.26 – 1985.10.25), appointed Bishop of Ipiales
 Octavio Betancourt Arango (1975.11.10 – 1977.04.26)
 José de Jesús Pimiento Rodríguez (1964.02.29 – 1975.05.22), appointed Archbishop of Manizales; future Cardinal
 Bishop of Garzón-Neiva, below
 Gerardo Martínez Madrigal (1964.02.25 – 1964.02.29)
 Bishops of Garzón, below
 Gerardo Martínez Madrigal (1942.06.24 – 1964.02.25)
 José Ignacio López Umaña (1924.04.10 – 1942.03.15), appointed Coadjutor Archbishop of Cartagena
 Esteban Rojas Tovar (1900.05.20 – 1922.07.21)

Other priests of this diocese who became bishops
Ismael Perdomo Borrero, appointed Bishop of Ibagué in 1903
Jacinto Vásquez Ochoa, appointed Bishop of Espinal in 1956

See also
Roman Catholicism in Colombia

Sources

External links
 Catholic Hierarchy
 GCatholic.org

Roman Catholic dioceses in Colombia
Roman Catholic Ecclesiastical Province of Ibagué
Christian organizations established in 1900
Roman Catholic dioceses and prelatures established in the 19th century